1922 legislative elections can refer to:
 Luxembourgian legislative election, 1922
 Philippine legislative election, 1922
 Polish legislative election, 1922